Bryostigma epiphyscium is a species of lichenicolous fungus in the order Arthoniales. Formerly classified in the genera Arthonia and Conida, it was transferred to the genus Bryostigma in 2020.

It is known to infect the lichen Physcia caesia and other lichens of the genus Physcia.

References

Arthoniomycetes
Fungi of Iceland
Fungi described in 1875
Taxa named by William Nylander (botanist)
Lichenicolous fungi